Sheshebee (also spelled Sheshabee) is an unincorporated community in Shamrock Township, Aitkin County, Minnesota, United States. The community is located along 188th Avenue near Aitkin County Road 6, Goshawk Street. Nearby places include McGregor, Palisade, Tamarack, Libby, and Lake Minnewawa.

References

Unincorporated communities in Aitkin County, Minnesota
Unincorporated communities in Minnesota